Cyrillus is a lunar impact crater located on the northwest edge of Mare Nectaris. Intruding into the northeast rim is the slightly larger, and younger crater Theophilus. To the south is another prominent crater named Catharina. Together these three craters form a prominent trio in the southeast quadrant of the Moon. To the northwest is Ibn-Rushd. Cyrillus is named after Saint Cyril of Alexandria, a 4th-century Coptic Pope and theologian.

The floor of Cyrillus contains a reduced central hill and the considerable crater Cyrillus A. The walls of the broken formation of Cyrillus remain intact until the point of junction with Theophilus. Slightly northeast of its center, three rounded mountains rise to heights of 1,000 metres above Cyrillus' floor: Cyrillus Alpha, Delta, and Eta.

A tiny crater with bright rays on the east side of Cyrillus has been named Shioli.

Satellite craters
By convention these features are identified on lunar maps by placing the letter on the side of the crater midpoint that is closest to Cyrillus.

The following craters have been renamed by the IAU.
 Cyrillus B — See Ibn-Rushd crater.

References

Impact craters on the Moon